milSuite is a collection of online applications focused on improving the methods of secure collaboration for the United States Department of Defense. The effort is produced by the U.S. Army PEO EIS MilTech Solutions office with the online suite consisting of five primary applications: milBook, milWiki, milTube, milUniversity and milSurvey.

Applications
The primary applications that make up milSuite were launched as a collection of connected sites in 2009 and focused on open source software to create DoD-audience exclusive versions of popular and successful public websites, such as Facebook and Wikipedia. milSuite uses Jive SBS for its professional networking site, milBook; MediaWiki for its online encyclopedia, milWiki; and WordPress for its news aggregator, milWire.

In June 2010, milSuite added milTube to its offering. The site was intended to provide a professional alternative to YouTube, with videos focused on military training and education. At the time of its launch, the deputy director for the Army's MilTech Solutions office, which produces milSuite, stated milTube will cater to a “more targeted audience to communicate on official [Defense Department] business.”

The next piece to join the milSuite brand of social media site imitators was Eureka. Launched in July 2012 as part of the milBook application but designed to feel independent, Eureka uses the concept of ideation to host discussions with the intent to bring about revolutionary solutions; like improved training, better ways to secure mobile devices, or any other problems that plague the military and hamper efficiency.

In 2013, milSuite executed a major release with updates to its core products and a change in the application lineup, re-purposing its WordPress site as milWire. milWire is designed to be an aggregator of news and information from across milSuite and the public web. It allows users to share original short blog posts or content from anywhere across the other milSuite sites into specific user and topic-based feeds, which other users of milSuite can then subscribe to or follow. 2013 was also the year milSuite added milUniversity as an online training tool. On May 23, 2018, milSuite executed a major update and migration from their traditional hosting environment to the DISA milCloud environment. The migration allowed milSuite to be more agile as a service with the ability to scale as necessary to support a growing number of users while simultaneously keeping maintenance costs low.

Creation and Usage

The milSuite product line grew out of a need for new knowledge management solutions for an Army workforce at Fort Monmouth, N.J., which was expected to lose a significant number of personnel due to the announcement of Base Realignment and Closure, 2005. Original use of an internal MediaWiki and internal WordPress site from 2007-08 focused on building and updating living knowledge archives, the expertise of departing leaders and the specialized knowledge of subject matter experts.

milBook was launched in the fall of 2009 to provide "a centralized location for Army personnel to discuss military topics that were previously done through potentially insecure emails, chats, wikis and blogs." The former, stand-alone MediaWiki and WordPress offerings were named milWiki and milBlog and joined with milBook to create milSuite.

The military has leveraged milSuite for several significant collaborative efforts since its launch. The United States Army Training and Doctrine Command begin using milWiki in 2010 to create online versions of field manuals in a wiki format, that could be contributed to by any soldier. The United States Army Forces Command partnered with milSuite in 2011 to develop a customized Virtual Training Portal for Soldiers using milWiki and milTube. In 2013, milBook was a key component in an initiative by the United States Air Force's Air Mobility Command to host and conduct conferences and courses virtually as a cost-cutting measure.

On October 3, 2016, the Army Office of Business Transformation launched Army Ideas for Innovation (AI2) as a replacement for the Army Suggestion Program (ASP), which was suspended in 2013. Created at the direction of the United States Under Secretary of the Army, AI2 is a crowd-source innovation program built on the milSuite platform.

The United States Air Force launched its own idea submission site for Airmen on milSuite in May 2017. The website, which directly supported Air Force Chief of Staff Gen. David L. Goldfein’s Focus Area number one – Revitalizing Air Force Squadrons, encouraged Airmen to address specific topics presented in the form of challenges and to help identify the best ideas by voting, commenting and sharing.

milSuite was featured as a secure alternative to public social media for Department of Defense collaboration at the Defense Information School's 2017 Social Media Workshop.

Contributors
milSuite is accessible to active military personnel, DoD civilian employees, and contractor employees, representing the Army, Navy, Marine Corps, Air Force, Space Force, and Coast Guard. The community, which includes participants at all levels of employment and military rank - from government interns to general officers - registered its 350,000th user in September 2013.

Awards and recognition
In 2009, milWiki received a Category III: Technology Dimension Army Knowledge Management Award, at the Army's annual LandwarNet Conference, in Fort Lauderdale, Fla.

At the following year's LandWarNet conference, in 2010, milBook claimed the top Army Knowledge Management award.

milWiki was the supporting application for the U.S. Training and Doctrine Command's (TRADOC) U.S. Army Field Manual Wiki project, which was recognized by the White House administration in 2010 as an Open Government Initiative.

In 2011, Government Computer News named milSuite one of its honorable mentions in the program's 24th Annual agency awards for information technology initiatives.

Historic Milestones 

 Army Team C4ISR Blog and Wiki launched: February 2008 and June 2008
 milWiki wins Army Knowledge Management Award: August 2009
 milBook launched birth of milSuite brand: October 2009
 milTube Launched: June 2010
 milBook wins Army Knowledge Management Award: August 2010
 milWiki Recognized as a White House Open Government Initiative: September 2010
 milsuite.mil address memo from DONCIO: December 2010
 Expansion to other services and use of the enterprise directory (milSuite Enterprise Edition): February 2011
 GCN named milSuite one of its honorable mentions in the program's 24th Annual agency awards: October 2011
 CAC Only milSuite: December 2011
 milSuite registers 200,000 member: March 2012
 GCDS: June 2012
 Gold Master Trusted Sites: July 2012
 eureka launched: July 2012
 DA CIO/G6 support (Funding and direct): September 2012
 milWire Launched: January 2013
 Army/DISA Direction from Army/DISA day to move forward with partnership: January 2013
 Army Professional Forums migrate to milBook: March 2013
 Original milUniversity to support milSuite products was released: March 2013
 milSuite was realigned into the EIEMA Domain under US Army CIO/G-6: May 2013
 milSuite registers 350,000 member: September 2013
 DISA DECC FOC: October 2013
 First milSuite-DCO Virtual Conference: November 2013
 500K user: January 2015
 COOP IOC: June 2015
 Initial DoD Mobility (sent icons and ready with products): September 2015
 milSuite IATO: 27 August 2015
 milSuite ATO: 27 January 2016
 AI2 becomes a Program of Record: 14 December 16
 CSAF Launches CSAF Revitalizing Squadrons: 15 May 17
 SMA Announces AI2: 9 June 17
 milSurvey Released: 30 June 17
 milUniversity Released: 30 June 17
 1M user registered for milSuite since DoD wide milSuite was released in 2011: 19 December 17

See also
 A-Space
 DoDTechipedia
 Intelink
 RallyPoint
 Social Software

References

United States Department of Defense
2009 establishments in the United States
Open-source intelligence
Military technology
Military communications
United States Department of Defense information technology
Enterprise wikis